Khalid Al Mawali is a politician and entrepreneur from Oman who is serving as Chairmen of the Consultative Assembly for three times.

References 

Omani politicians
Year of birth missing (living people)
Living people